The streak-crowned antvireo (Dysithamnus striaticeps) is a species of bird in the family Thamnophilidae. It is found in Costa Rica, Honduras, and Nicaragua. Its natural habitat is subtropical or tropical moist lowland forests.

References

External links
Xeno-canto: audio recordings of the  streak-crowned antvireo

Dysithamnus
Birds described in 1865
Birds of Costa Rica
Birds of Honduras
Birds of Nicaragua
Taxonomy articles created by Polbot